Taradgaon railway station is a small railway station in Pune district, Maharashtra. Its code is TDG. It serves Taradgaon city. The station will consists of a single platform. the station is under-construction and lies on Lonand–Daund line.

References

Railway stations in Pune district
Pune railway division